Bellver is a surname. Notable people with the surname include:

Enrique Moreno Bellver (1963–2012), Spanish footballer
Mariano Bellver ( – 2018), Spanish art collector
Ricardo Bellver (1845—1924), Spanish sculptor
Sergi Bellver (born 1971), Spanish short story writer

See also
Bellver Castle